18203/18204 Durg - Kanpur Betwa Express  is a passenger service of the Indian Railways, which runs between Durg Junction railway station railway station of Durg, an important city in Central Indian state of Chhattisgarh and Kanpur Central railway station of Kanpur, the most populous city of Uttar Pradesh. The name "Betwa Express" has been given after Betwa River. Betwa Express runs twice a week in both directions and covers a distance of 883 km between these cities in approximately 17 hours 40 minutes

Coach composition
Betwa Express is recently upgraded to LHB coaches. it has 2 unreserved coaches, 12 sleeper coaches, 3 AC Tier III coaches and 2 AC Tier II coach.

Traction
.

Route

References

Transport in Durg
Trains from Kanpur
Railway services introduced in 2004
Named passenger trains of India
Rail transport in Chhattisgarh
Rail transport in Madhya Pradesh
Express trains in India